Cacica is a commune located in Suceava County, in the historical region of Bukovina, northeastern Romania. At the 2011 census, 74.8% of inhabitants were Romanians, 20.2% Poles, and 4.4% Ukrainians. Its Polish inhabitants are descended from settlers who arrived there at the turn of the 19th century during the Habsburg period.

Administration and local politics

Commune council 

The commune's current local council has the following political composition, according to the results of the 2020 Romanian local elections:

Villages 

The commune is composed of five villages: namely Cacica, Maidan, Pârteștii de Sus (the commune center), Runcu, and Solonețu Nou.

Solonețu Nou 

Solonețu Nou is one of the Polish villages in Suceava County, in the historical region of Bukovina, northeastern Romania. It was established in 1834 by 30 Polish families in the Soloneț river valley.

A Polish school was founded in the village in 1870. 523 people from the village were deported to Poland after 1945 and the school was closed. After the Romanian Revolution of 1989, the Polish school was reopened. In 1995 there were 718 inhabitants in the village. The Polish community from Solonețu Nou (together with those of Solca, Pleșa, Racova, and Arbore) has 365 families with 1046 Roman Catholics of Polish ethnicity.

Natives 

 Ghervazen Longher, Polish-Romanian politician
 Serghei Nicolau, Russian-Romanian communist espionage chief and a Securitate general

Gallery

See also
 Polish minority in Romania

References

  Pr. Mihai Patrașcu, Vizită pastorală la Soloneţu Nou ("A pastoral visit to Solonețu Nou"), on the site of the Roman Catholic Episcopate of Iași. Undated, but index places it as December 2005. Accessed 7 Jan 2006.

External links

 Polish Community in Cacica
 The Salt Mine from Cacica

Communes in Suceava County
Localities in Southern Bukovina
Mining communities in Romania
Polish communities in Romania